Parotomys is a small genus of rodent in the family Muridae. Member species are found in the African countries of Botswana, Namibia, and South Africa.
It contains the following two species:
 Brants's whistling rat (Parotomys brantsii)
 Littledale's whistling rat (Parotomys littledalei)

References

 
Rodent genera
Taxa named by Oldfield Thomas
Taxonomy articles created by Polbot